3-Hydroxyoctanoic acid is a beta-hydroxy acid that is naturally produced in humans, other animals, and plants.  

3-Hydroxyoctanoic acid is the primary endogenous agonist of hydroxycarboxylic acid receptor 3 (HCA3), a G protein-coupled receptor protein which is encoded by the human gene HCAR3. In plants, signalling chemical emitted by the orchid Cymbidium floribundum and recognized by Japanese honeybees (Apis cerana japonica).

References 

Fatty acids
Beta hydroxy acids
Cymbidium